Baeturia hardyi (de Boer, 1996) is a species of cicada named for comedian Oliver Hardy.  A similar species, B. laureli, was named after his partner Stan Laurel.

See also
List of organisms named after famous people (born 1800–1899)

References

Insects described in 1996
Laurel and Hardy
Chlorocystini